30-hole and Fred Perry released through "Danse Macabre Records" is the third album of the Italian Electro Industrial one-man project Digitalis Purpurea. It was released on 24 April 2012 with a worldwide distribution.

Themes and lyrics
“30-hole and Fred Perry" is the third chapter of DIGITALIS PURPUREA's "cinematic trilogy". 
The two previous excerpts are the full-length albums Aseptic White and Emotional Decompression Chamber.
The controversial content of the record is irreverent, ugly and provocative. "Bubblegum-Pop" artworks, explicit sexuality and the ostensible superficiality of lyrics and contents are intentionally flaunted with satire and irony. 
Although maintaining the cinematic feature of the previous works now atmospheres tune into a less noble mood.
To frame these intentions the artwork is inspired by Terry Richardson crude pictures and Barbara Kruger subversive slogans.
The texts are influenced by Charles Bukowski and the following quote could be the album’ slogan:
"Hospitals and jails and whores; these are the universities of life. I´ve got several degrees. Call me Mr."
The title track "30-hole and Fred Perry" is the first single extracted that will lead the promotional propaganda. The track has been produced in collaboration with the famous American sound-tech Ted Jensen.

Commercial performance
The album entered the Top 10 of DAC – Deutsche Alternative Charts and it has been a "bullet" in the single-category in 2012.

Artwork
The artwork sees again the collaboration with the graphic artist and photographer Anna Taschini. The theme is sexually explicit and uses contemporary pop music stylistic with irony.

Track listing
All songs written by Cristian Marovino a.k.a. Pi Greco.
"30-hole and Fred Perry" – 2:51
"Pussy is prêt-à-porter, girls' ass is for élites" – 1:50
"The sky is the biggest cunt of them all" – 3:21
"I don't give a fuck ye-yea-YEAH!" – 3:10
"Even if all, no I don't" – 5:00
"When Perry Cum [Remix]" – 5:39

Personnel
Digitalis Purpurea
Cristian Pi Greco – Vocals, Synthesizer, Drum machine, songwriter, Producer
Luke K – guitar, bass guitar

Production
Cristian Marovino – Mix and Mastering
Ted Jensen – Mastering engineer of "30-hole and Fred Perry" title-track
Anna Lucylle Taschini – Graphic Design, cover photography
Medea – Cover model

Notes

External links
Digitalis Purpurea – official web site
Digitalis Purpurea  – official SoundCloud
Danse Macabre Records – official label site

2012 albums
Digitalis Purpurea (band) albums